Oskar Icha (11 October 1886, Vienna – 1 October 1945, Vienna) was an Austrian sculptor who specialized in reliefs.

Life and work 
He studied sculpting at the Academy of Fine Arts, Vienna, where his primary instructor was Anton Hanak. During his time there, he received several awards, including the Academy's Gundel-Prize for excellence.

In 1930, the city of Vienna commissioned several reliefs for community buildings and, in 1931, he received a gold medal from the Albrecht-Dürer-Bund, an artists' society founded in 1851.

He committed suicide in 1945, and was interred at the Jedleseer Friedhof. In 1971, a street in Vienna's  district was named after him.

References

External links 

1886 births
1945 deaths
20th-century Austrian sculptors
Reliefs
Academy of Fine Arts Vienna alumni
Sculptors who committed suicide
Artists from Vienna
1945 suicides
Austrian male sculptors
Suicides in Austria
20th-century Austrian male artists